, also known as Shakuchi Castle, is a  (hilltop castle) located in Ōshū, Iwate Prefecture, Japan. During the eleventh century in the late Heian Period, Fujiwara no Tsunekiyo and his son Fujiwara no Kiyohira were the lords of the castle. Today, most of the castle is in ruins, and Hachiman Shrine, Iwayadō Elementary School, and Iwayadō High School stand on the site.

Further reading

References

Castles in Iwate Prefecture